This is a comprehensive list of victories of the  cycling team. The races are categorized according to the UCI Continental Circuits rules.

2012 – GreenEDGE Cycling / Orica–GreenEDGE

 Road Race Championships, Simon Gerrans
 Road Race Championships, Daniel Teklehaimanot
 Time Trial Championships, Luke Durbridge
 Time Trial Championships, Svein Tuft
 Time Trial Championships, Daniel Teklehaimanot
 Overall Tour Down Under, Simon Gerrans
Stage 1 Tirreno–Adriatico, Team time trial
Milan – San Remo, Simon Gerrans
 Overall Volta a Catalunya, Michael Albasini
Stages 1 & 2, Michael Albasini
Stage 2 Tour of the Basque Country, Daryl Impey
 Overall Circuit de la Sarthe, Luke Durbridge
Stage 3 (ITT), Luke Durbridge
Stage 3 Giro d'Italia, Matthew Goss
Stage 3 Tour of Norway, Aidis Kruopis
Prologue Critérium du Dauphiné, Luke Durbridge
Stage 2 Tour of Slovenia, Daryl Impey
Stage 8 Tour de Suisse, Michael Albasini
Stage 4 Tour de Pologne, Aidis Kruopis
Stage 2 Eneco Tour, Team time trial
Stage 6 (ITT) Eneco Tour, Svein Tuft
 Overall Tour du Poitou-Charentes, Luke Durbridge
Stages 1 & 2, Aidis Kruopis
Stage 4 (ITT), Luke Durbridge
 Mountains classification, Vuelta a España, Simon Clarke
Stage 4, Simon Clarke
Grand Prix Cycliste de Québec, Simon Gerrans
Stage 2 Tour of Britain, Leigh Howard
Duo Normand, Luke Durbridge & Svein Tuft
 African Time Trial Daniel Teklehaymanot

2013 – Orica–GreenEDGE

 Road Race Championships, Luke Durbridge
 Time Trial Championships, Luke Durbridge
 Time Trial Championships, Daryl Impey
 Road Race Championships, Tomas Vaitkus
 Australian National Criterium, Cameron Meyer
Stage 4 (ITT) Tour de San Luis, Svein Tuft
Stage 5 Tour Down Under, Simon Gerrans
Trofeo Campos–Santanyí–Ses Salines, Leigh Howard
Trofeo Platja de Muro, Leigh Howard
Stage 4 Paris–Nice, Michael Albasini
Stage 2 Tirreno–Adriatico, Matthew Goss
 Oceania Road Race Cameron Meyer
Stage 6 Volta a Catalunya, Simon Gerrans
Stage 1 Tour of the Basque Country, Simon Gerrans
Stage 2 Tour of the Basque Country, Daryl Impey
Stage 3 (ITT) Circuit de la Sarthe, Luke Durbridge
Stage 2 Tour of Turkey, Aidis Kruopis
Stage 2 Bayern-Rundfahrt, Daryl Impey
Grand Prix of Aargau Canton, Michael Albasini
Stage 1 (ITT) Tour de Suisse, Cameron Meyer
Stage 1 (ITT) Tour of Slovenia, Svein Tuft
Stage 4 Tour of Slovenia, Brett Lancaster
Stage 3 Tour de France, Simon Gerrans
Stage 4 Tour de France, Team time trial
Prueba Villafranca de Ordizia, Daniel Teklehaymanot
 Overall Tour de Pologne, Pieter Weening
Stages 2 & 4 Tour of Utah, Michael Matthews
Stages 2 & 3 Vuelta a Burgos, Jens Keukeleire
Stages 5 & 21 Vuelta a España, Michael Matthews
Duo Normand, Luke Durbridge & Svein Tuft
 African Time Trial Daniel Teklehaymanot

2014 – Orica–GreenEDGE

 Time Trial Championships, Michael Hepburn
 Road Race Championships, Simon Gerrans
 Time Trial Championships, Daryl Impey
 Time Trial Championships, Svein Tuft
 Road Race Championships, Svein Tuft
 Overall Tour Down Under, Simon Gerrans
Stage 1, Simon Gerrans
 Overall Herald Sun Tour, Simon Clarke
Stage 2, Simon Clarke
Stage 3 (ITT) Tour of Qatar, Michael Hepburn
 Oceania Road Race Luke Durbridge
Vuelta a La Rioja, Michael Matthews
Stage 3 Tour of the Basque Country, Michael Matthews
Liège–Bastogne–Liège, Simon Gerrans
Stages 1, 2 & 4 Tour de Romandie, Michael Albasini
 Overall Tour of Turkey, Adam Yates
Stage 6, Adam Yates
Stage 1 Giro d'Italia, Team time trial
Stage 6 Giro d'Italia, Michael Matthews
Stage 6 Tour of California, Esteban Chaves
Stage 9 Giro d'Italia, Pieter Weening
Stage 3 Bayern-Rundfahrt, Daryl Impey
Stage 2 Tour de Suisse, Cameron Meyer
Stage 1 (ITT) Tour of Slovenia, Michael Matthews
Stage 8 Tour de Suisse, Esteban Chaves
GP Industria & Artigianato, Adam Yates
Giro della Toscana, Pieter Weening
Stage 3 Vuelta a España, Michael Matthews
 Overall Tour of Alberta, Daryl Impey
Stage 5, Daryl Impey
Grand Prix Cycliste de Québec, Simon Gerrans
Grand Prix Cycliste de Montréal, Simon Gerrans
Tre Valli Varesine, Michael Albasini

2015 – Orica–GreenEDGE

 Time Trial Championships, Daryl Impey
 Overall Herald Sun Tour, Cameron Meyer
Stage 1, Cameron Meyer
Stages 2 & 3, Caleb Ewan
 Oceania Time Trial Michael Hepburn
Stages 3 & 6 Tour de Langkawi, Caleb Ewan
Stage 3 Paris–Nice, Michael Matthews
Vuelta a La Rioja, Caleb Ewan
Stage 1 Tour of the Basque Country, Michael Matthews
Stages 2 & 3 Tour de Romandie, Michael Albasini
Stage 1 Giro d'Italia, Team time trial
Stage 3 Giro d'Italia, Michael Matthews
 Overall Tour de Korea, Caleb Ewan
Stages 2, 3, 5 & 7, Caleb Ewan
Stage 4 Tour de Suisse, Michael Matthews
Clásica de San Sebastián, Adam Yates
Stage 2 & 6 Vuelta a España, Esteban Chaves
Stage 5 Vuelta a España, Caleb Ewan
Stage 2 Tour of Alberta, Michael Matthews
 Overall Abu Dhabi Tour, Esteban Chaves
Stage 3, Esteban Chaves

2016 – Orica–GreenEDGE / Orica–BikeExchange

 National Criterium Championships, Caleb Ewan
People's Choice Classic, Caleb Ewan
 Overall Tour Down Under, Simon Gerrans
Stages 1 & 6, Caleb Ewan
Stages 3 & 4, Simon Gerrans
Stage 2 Herald Sun Tour, Caleb Ewan
 National Time Trial Championships, Daryl Impey
Prologue (ITT) & Stage 2 Paris–Nice, Michael Matthews
Vuelta Ciclista a La Rioja, Michael Matthews
Paris–Roubaix, Mathew Hayman
Stage 5 Tour de Romandie, Michael Albasini
Stage 14 Giro d'Italia, Esteban Chaves
Stage 1 Tour of Slovenia, Jens Keukeleire
 Time Trial Championships, Cheung King Lok
 Road Race Championships, Cheung King Lok
Stage 10 Tour de France, Michael Matthews
 Young rider classification Tour de France, Adam Yates
Prueba Villafranca de Ordizia, Simon Yates
Vattenfall Cyclassics, Caleb Ewan
Stage 6 Vuelta a España, Simon Yates
Stage 12 Vuelta a España, Jens Keukeleire
Stages 18 & 21  Vuelta a España, Magnus Cort Nielsen
Stage 8 Tour of Britain, Caleb Ewan
Giro dell'Emilia, Esteban Chaves
Duo Normand, Luke Durbridge & Svein Tuft
Il Lombardia, Esteban Chaves

2017 – Orica–Scott

 National Criterium Championships, Caleb Ewan
People's Choice Classic, Caleb Ewan
Stages 1, 3, 4 & 6 Tour Down Under, Caleb Ewan
 Overall Herald Sun Tour, Damien Howson
Stage 1, Damien Howson
Stage 3 Volta a la Comunitat Valenciana, Magnus Cort Nielsen
 National Time Trial Championships, Daryl Impey
Clásica de Almería, Magnus Cort Nielsen
Stage 4 Abu Dhabi Tour, Caleb Ewan
GP Industria & Artigianato, Adam Yates
Stage 6 Paris–Nice, Simon Yates
Stage 6 Volta a Catalunya, Daryl Impey
Stage 3b Three Days of De Panne, Luke Durbridge
GP Miguel Induráin, Simon Yates
Stage 2 Tour of the Basque Country, Michael Albasini
Stage 1 Tour de Romandie, Michael Albasini
Stage 4 Tour de Romandie, Simon Yates
Stage 7 Giro d'Italia, Caleb Ewan
Stage 2 Tour of Slovenia, Luka Mezgec
 Time Trial Championships, Cheung King Lok
 National Road Race Championships, Luka Mezgec
 Time Trial Championships, Svein Tuft
 Young rider classification Tour de France, Simon Yates
 Slovenian MTB XC Championships, Luka Mezgec
Stage 4 Tour de Pologne, Caleb Ewan
Stage 6 Tour de Pologne, Jack Haig
Arnhem–Veenendaal Classic, Luka Mezgec
Pro Ötztaler 5500, Roman Kreuziger
 Slovenian Cyclo-cross Championship, Luka Mezgec

2018 – Mitchelton–Scott

  National Criterium Championships, Caleb Ewan
  National Road Race Championships, Alexander Edmondson
 Overall Tour Down Under, Daryl Impey
Stage 2, Caleb Ewan
 Overall Herald Sun Tour, Esteban Chaves
1st Stage 3, Esteban Chaves
 National Time Trial Championships, Daryl Impey
 National Road Race Championships, Daryl Impey
Clásica de Almería, Caleb Ewan
Stage 7 Paris–Nice, Simon Yates
Stage 5 Tirreno–Adriatico Adam Yates
Stage 7 Volta a Catalunya, Simon Yates
Stage 6 Giro d'Italia, Esteban Chaves
Stages 9, 11 & 15 Giro d'Italia, Simon Yates
 Overall Tour des Fjords, Michael Albasini
Stage 2, Michael Albasini
Stage 20 Giro d'Italia, Mikel Nieve
Overall Hammer Stavanger
Stages 1, 2 & 3 
Stages 2 & 3 Hammer Sportzone Limburg
Stage 1 Critérium du Dauphiné, Daryl Impey
Stage 8 Critérium du Dauphiné, Adam Yates
Stage 4 Tour de Suisse, Christopher Juul-Jensen
 National Time Trial Championships, Svein Tuft
Prueba Villafranca-Ordiziako Klasika, Robert Power
Stage 2 Tour of Britain, Cameron Meyer
Stage 7 Tour de Pologne, Simon Yates
 Overall Vuelta a España, Simon Yates
Stage 14, Simon Yates
Stage 8 Tour of Britain, Caleb Ewan

2019 – Mitchelton–Scott

  National Time Trial Championships, Luke Durbridge
 Overall Tour Down Under, Daryl Impey
Stage 4, Daryl Impey
Stage 4 Herald Sun Tour, Nick Schultz
Stage 2 Volta a la Comunitat Valenciana, Matteo Trentin
 National Time Trial Championships, Daryl Impey
 National Road Race Championships, Daryl Impey
Stage 2 Vuelta a Andalucía, Matteo Trentin
Stage 4 Vuelta a Andalucía, Simon Yates
Stage 1 (TTT) Tirreno–Adriatico
Stage 5 (ITT) Paris–Nice, Simon Yates
Stage 3 Volta a Catalunya, Adam Yates
Stage 1b (TTT) Settimana Internazionale di Coppi e Bartali
Stage 6 Tour of the Basque Country, Adam Yates
Stage 19, Giro d'Italia, Esteban Chaves
Stage 4 Tour of Norway, Edoardo Affini
Stage 3 Hammer Limburg
Stage 2 Tour of Slovenia, Luka Mezgec
 National Time Trial Championships, Tsgabu Grmay
Stage 9 Tour de France, Daryl Impey
Stage 12 & 15 Tour de France, Simon Yates
Stage 17 Tour de France, Matteo Trentin
Stage 2 & 5 Tour de Pologne, Luka Mezgec
 Overall Czech Cycling Tour, Daryl Impey
Stage 1, TTT
Stage 4, Lucas Hamilton
Stage 2 Tour of Britain, Matteo Trentin
Stage 6 (ITT) Tour of Britain, Edoardo Affini
 Overall CRO Race, Adam Yates
Stage 5, Adam Yates

2020 – Mitchelton–Scott

  National Time Trial Championships, Luke Durbridge
  National Road Race Championships, Cameron Meyer
Stages 3 & 5 Herald Sun Tour, Kaden Groves
 National Time Trial Championships, Daryl Impey
Stage 4 Vuelta a Andalucía, Jack Haig
 Overall UAE Tour, Adam Yates
Stage 3, Adam Yates 
 Overall Czech Cycling Tour, Damien Howson
Stage 1, TTT
Stage 4, Damien Howson
 Time Trial Championships, Barnabás Peák
 Overall Tirreno–Adriatico, Simon Yates
Stage 4, Lucas Hamilton
Stage 5, Simon Yates
Coppa Sabatini, Dion Smith

2021 – Team BikeExchange

 National Criterium Championships, Kaden Groves
 National Road Race Championships, Cameron Meyer
Stage 4 Volta a Catalunya, Esteban Chaves
 Overall Tour of the Alps, Simon Yates
Stage 2, Simon Yates
 Overall Tour de Hongrie, Damien Howson
Stage 4, Damien Howson
Stage 19 Giro d'Italia, Simon Yates
Stage 2 Czech Cycling Tour, Nick Schultz
Prologue Okolo Slovenska, Kaden Groves

2022 – Team BikeExchange–Jayco

Stages 3 & 5 Saudi Tour, Dylan Groenewegen
Stage 8 Paris–Nice, Simon Yates
Stage 1 Volta a Catalunya, Michael Matthews
Stage 2 Volta a Catalunya, Kaden Groves
Stage 2 Tour of Turkey, Kaden Groves
Stages 1 & 3 Vuelta Asturias, Simon Yates
Stage 2 (ITT) & 14 Giro d'Italia, Simon Yates
Stage 4 Tour de Hongrie, Dylan Groenewegen
Veenendaal–Veenendaal Classic, Dylan Groenewegen
Stage 21 Giro d'Italia, Matteo Sobrero
Stage 2 Tour of Slovenia, Dylan Groenewegen
 National Time Trial Championships, Lawson Craddock
Stage 3 Tour de France, Dylan Groenewegen
Stage 14 Tour de France, Michael Matthews
Prueba Villafranca de Ordizia, Simon Yates
 Overall Vuelta a Castilla y León, Simon Yates
Stage 2, Simon Yates
Stage 2 Arctic Race of Norway, Dylan Groenewegen
Stage 11 Vuelta a España, Kaden Groves

2023 – Team Jayco–AlUla

Stage 5 Tour Down Under, Simon Yates
Stage 1 Saudi Tour, Dylan Groenewegen
Stage 5 UAE Tour, Dylan Groenewegen

Supplementary statistics
Sources

References

External links

Wins
GreenEDGE